Goshute Canyon Wilderness is a  wilderness area in northern White Pine County in the U.S. state of Nevada.  Located in the Cherry Creek Range north of the town of Mcgill, the Wilderness was created by the "White Pine County Conservation, Recreation and Development Act of 2006" and is administered by the U.S. Bureau of Land Management.

Vegetation in the Wilderness consists primarily of thick pinyon pine and juniper stands at the lower elevations, while bristlecone and limber pine thrive in the higher elevations.  Aspen and cottonwood trees crowd the moist drainages along the creeks that flow through the Wilderness.

Goshute Cave
Eroding natural limestone in the Cherry Creek Range has created Goshute Cave, an underground network of caves popular with cavers in the Wilderness.

Wildlife
Various species of wildlife can be found in Goshute Canyon Wilderness, including Bonneville cutthroat trout, mule deer, mountain lion, bobcat, owl, falcon, eagle, hawk, kestrel, blue grouse, sage grouse, and marmot.

Recreation
Popular recreational activities in Goshute Canyon Wilderness include camping, hiking, hunting, fishing, and caving.

See also
List of wilderness areas in Nevada
List of U.S. Wilderness Areas
Wilderness Act

References

External links
Goshute Canyon Wilderness Study Area fact sheet - Nevada BLM
Goshute Canyon Wilderness - Nevada BLM
Bristlecone Wilderness - Friends of Nevada Wilderness
"Scientists Voice Their Overwhelming Support for Wilderness Designations in White Pine County, Nevada" by the Wilderness Society
Goshute Canyon Wilderness

Wilderness areas of Nevada
Protected areas of White Pine County, Nevada
Bureau of Land Management areas in Nevada